Jean-Christophe Péraud (born 22 May 1977) is a retired French cyclist who rode for  and  during his professional career. He was a member of the French team at the 2008 and 2012 Summer Olympics.

Career 
Péraud was European cross-country champion in 2005 and world team champion in 2008. Competing at the 2008 Summer Olympics in Beijing he won the silver medal in the cross-country race. In June 2009 he became the surprise winner of the French National Time Trial Championships. This led to him being signed by UCI ProTour team  for the 2010 season, to increase its time-trialing presence in stage races.

In 2011, Péraud achieved 6th place overall at the Critérium International and ninth place overall in the Tour de France. He crashed out in the final week of the 2013 Tour de France during the time trial, falling in a slippery late-apex corner, in the same spot his family had gathered to cheer him on, with less than two kilometers to go, riding with a non-displaced fractured collarbone sustained in a prior crash the very same morning. Péraud had again been placed ninth on the general classification before the incident. According to cyclingnews.com, Péraud responded in a composed manner concerning the incident:

"I didn't feel that I was taking too many risks, I was descending as I know how but I was surprised by the corner. It's part of sport. I'm okay and it's only a broken collarbone. It will be a relief to get home, and we'll think about my next objective when my body recovers."

In 2014, Péraud won the Critérium International in March. He also recorded top-five finishes in Tirreno–Adriatico, the Volta ao Algarve, and the Tour of the Basque Country. Péraud followed this up with a strong performance in the Tour de France, where he finished in second place in the final general classification, behind Vincenzo Nibali and ahead of Thibaut Pinot. He and Pinot became the first Frenchmen to finish in the top three overall in the Tour de France since Richard Virenque finished as runner-up overall in 1997. It was the first time in 30 years that two Frenchmen finished in the top three overall in the Tour de France – Laurent Fignon (winner) and Bernard Hinault (runner-up) finished in the top two overall in 1984.

In 2015, Péraud repeated his victory on the 2.HC Critérium International by winning the last stage finishing atop the Col de l'Ospedale. He won the general classification with a gap of ten seconds to fellow Frenchman Thibaut Pinot. Following his victory, Péraud stated "At the start, I thought that I would help Alexis Vuillermoz. But I attacked and I found myself alone. This victory is important after hard times and two surgeries this winter."

Career achievements

Major results

2006
 1st Les Boucles du Sud-Ardèche
2009
 1st  Time trial, National Road Championships
 2nd Chrono des Nations
2010
 4th Overall Tour of the Basque Country
 9th Overall Paris–Nice
2011
 2nd Overall Tour Méditerranéen
 4th Overall Tour du Poitou-Charentes
 6th Overall Paris–Nice
 6th Overall Critérium International
 7th Overall Critérium du Dauphiné
 7th Overall Tour of Beijing
 8th Overall Tour de l'Ain
 9th Overall Tour de France
 10th Tour du Doubs
2012
 4th Overall Tour du Poitou-Charentes
 7th Overall Tour of the Basque Country
2013
 2nd Overall Tour Méditerranéen
1st Stage 4
 3rd Overall Paris–Nice
 5th Overall Critérium International
 6th Overall Tour de Romandie
2014
 1st  Overall Critérium International
 2nd Overall Tour de France
 2nd Overall Tour Méditerranéen
1st Stage 5
 3rd Overall Tour of the Basque Country
 4th Overall Tirreno–Adriatico
 5th Overall Tour de l'Ain
 10th UCI World Tour
2015
 1st  Overall Critérium International
1st Stage 3
 8th Boucles de l'Aulne
2016
 9th Overall Giro del Trentino

General classification results timeline

Mountain Bike

2003
 1st Roc d'Azur
2005
 1st  Cross-country, UEC European Championships
 2nd Cross-country, National Championships
2007
 1st Roc d'Azur
 3rd Cross-country, National Championships
2008
 1st  Team relay, UCI World Championships
 1st  Team relay, UEC European Championships
 2nd  Cross-country, Olympic Games
 2nd Cross-country, National Championships
 UCI XC World Cup
3rd Madrid
2009
 UCI XC World Cup
3rd Offenburg

References

External links 

 
 
 
 
 
 
 
 
 

1977 births
Living people
French male cyclists
Olympic cyclists of France
Olympic silver medalists for France
Olympic medalists in cycling
Cyclists at the 2004 Summer Olympics
Cyclists at the 2008 Summer Olympics
Cyclists at the 2012 Summer Olympics
Cross-country mountain bikers
Medalists at the 2008 Summer Olympics
Knights of the Ordre national du Mérite
Sportspeople from Toulouse
Cyclists from Occitania (administrative region)